Rai Sport HD is an Italian sports TV channel, launched in 1999 by the state-owned RAI television network. It broadcast Italian and international sports events in Italy on DTT channel 58 on Rai Mux A from HDTV. It is also available on Sky Italia.

On 18 May 2010 a sister channel, Rai Sport 2 was launched. However the channel closed on 5 February 2017. Rai Sport + HD launched on 14 September 2015, reviving the Rai Sport + brand that was used from 2009 to 2010.

Logos and identities

Programming
The channel broadcasts three editions of the Tg Sport: the first at 9 am every day, with press review to touchscreen, the second to 2.30 pm from Monday to Saturday, the last at 11.30 pm from Monday to Friday.

A few programme include:
 Lega Basket Serie A (LBA)
 Campionato Nazionale Primavera
 FIFA Futsal World Cup
 FIFA U-17 World Cup
 I-league 
 A Lyga 
 Italy national under-21
 Lega Pro Prima Divisione
 Lega Pro Seconda Divisione
 Serie D
 I-League
 Coppa Italia Lega Pro
 Coppa Italia Serie D
 Coppa Italia Dilettanti
 Diretta Azzurra
 90° Minuto Champions
 Magazine Champions
 Magazine Europa
 Magazine Europa Conference
 Sabato Sprint
 A tutta Coppa
 Lega Pro

References

External links
Official website 
Rai Sport Biss Code

Sport 1
Television channels and stations established in 1999
Sports television in Italy
Italian-language television stations
1999 establishments in Italy